Lubomyra (Cyrillic: Любомира) is the second full-length release, and first solo album by the Canadian-Ukrainian singer-songwriter Luba, then known under her full name Lubomyra. It was released around 1977 by SAGE Promotions and features eleven tracks, two of which ("Carpathia" and "Starry Eyes") were combined into one full-length song. All the songs are traditional or covers of popular Ukrainian songs, with a new arrangement, featuring elements of jazz, blues and rock. The song "Kazka" was composed by Luba herself. The album is currently out of print.

Track listing

Personnel
 Lubomyra Kowalchuk - Vocals
 Gerald Gudzio - Acoustic guitar, rhythm guitar 
 Peter Marunczak Jr - Percussion 
 Yourko Kulycky - Keyboards 
 Paul Anthony - Lead rhythm guitar 
 John Jason - Bass
 Peter Humenny - Mandolin
 Steve-Geoff-Gordon - Brass
Engineering: Gaetan Desbiens, Dave Boke, Mark Laschuk
Photography: Irene Studios, Asbed Patakian

References

External links
 Information about the album
 RYM
 Discogs

1977 albums
Luba (singer) albums
Ukrainian folk music